Neith is a hypothetical natural satellite of Venus reportedly sighted by Giovanni Cassini in 1672 and by several other astronomers in following years. The first supposed sighting of this moon was in 1650. It was 'observed' up to 30 times by astronomers until 1770, when there were no new sightings and it was not found during the transit of Venus in 1761 and 1769.

Discovery

In 1672, Giovanni Cassini found a small object close to Venus. He did not take great note of his observation, but when he saw it again in 1686, he made a formal announcement of a possible moon of Venus.

Summary of sightings

Observations
Many astronomers failed to find any moon during their observations of Venus, including William Herschel in 1768. Cassini originally observed Neith to be one-fourth the diameter of Venus.  In 1761, Lagrange announced that Neith's orbital plane was perpendicular to the ecliptic. That same year, however, mathematician Jean le Rond d'Alembert wrote to Voltaire that Neith had "declined to follow his mistress during her passage over the sun", questioning whether Venus truly had a moon. In 1766, the director of the Vienna Observatory speculated that the observations of the moon were optical illusions. He said: "the bright image of Venus was reflected in the eye and back into the telescope, creating a smaller secondary image." In 1777, J.H. Lambert estimated its orbital period as eleven days and three hours.

In 1884, Jean-Charles Houzeau, the former director of the Royal Observatory of Brussels suggested that the "moon" was actually a planet which orbited the Sun every 283 days. Such a planet would be in conjunction with Venus every 1080 days, which fit with the recorded observations.  Houzeau was also the first to give the object the name Neith, after an Egyptian goddess.

The Belgian Academy of Sciences published a paper in 1887 which studied each reported sighting of Neith.  Ultimately, they determined that most of the sightings could be explained by stars which had been in the vicinity of Venus, including Chi Orionis, M Tauri, 71 Orionis, Nu Geminorum and Theta Librae.

See also
List of hypothetical astronomical objects
2002 VE68, a quasi-satellite of Venus
2013 ND15, a temporary trojan of Venus
Venus

References

External links
Neith, the Moon of Venus

Hypothetical bodies of the Solar System
Hypothetical moons
Venus
Planetary satellite systems